Say You Want Me is a 1977 Australian film directed by Oliver Howes. It is about a woman who is raped by one of her husband's business associates.

References

External links

Say You Want Me at Screen Australia

Australian television films
1977 films
Films directed by Oliver Howes
1970s English-language films
1970s Australian films